The Parable of the Budding Fig Tree is a parable told by Jesus in the New Testament, found in , , and . This parable, about the Kingdom of God, involves a fig tree, as does the equally brief parable of the barren fig tree.

Narrative
According to the Gospel of Luke:

Interpretations
Luke presents this parable as eschatological in nature: like the leaves of the fig tree, the signs spoken of in the Olivet discourse of  indicate the coming of the Kingdom of God.

As the British scholar and theologian N. T. Wright has written, "Already present in Jesus' ministry, and climactically inaugurated in his death and resurrection, the divine kingdom will be manifest within a generation, when Jesus and his followers are vindicated in and through the destruction of Jerusalem."

See also
 Figs in the Bible
 Fruit of the Holy Spirit
 Life of Jesus in the New Testament
 Luke 21
 Mark 13
 Matthew 24
 Olivet discourse
 The Tree and its Fruits
 The Vine

References

Citations

Sources

Budding Fig Tree
 
Trees in Christianity